I Don't Think It Is is the seventh full-length studio album by American rock band Say Anything.

Release
On February 2, 2016, frontman Max Bemis sent out a message stating "You know what? We're gonna stream our whole new record and drop it on Friday. Enjoy. #IDontThinkItIs." The album was then available to be streamed through the Equal Vision Records YouTube channel. On February 5, the album was released to digital music retailers and other streaming services. In April and May 2017, the group went on co-headlining US tour with Bayside with support from Reggie and the Full Effect and Hot Rod Circuit. To promote the tour, Say Anything covered Bayside's "They're Not Horses, They're Unicorns", while Bayside covered Say Anything's "Night's Songs".

Reception
I Don't Think It Is was met with polarizing reception from critics and fans alike. Sputnikmusic staff gave the album 3.5 out of 5, elaborating that while the album was "not as initially rewarding as his typical work, the constant energy mixed with the ‘rough around the edges’ approach will keep you coming back for more. In a way, Say Anything's latest surprise release is more compelling for what it represents than the actual music it contains." New Noise Magazine awarded the album 4.5 out of 5 stars, writing that the band's "grinding honesty and gritty passion bring to mind the days of …Is a Real Boy, but with more feedback and writing maturity."

Track listing
All songs recorded by Say Anything.

Bonus tracks

Chart performance

Credits
According to the liner notes:
 Max Bemis - Vocals, Guitar, Bass guitar, Keys
 Darren King - Drums, Programming, Sampling, Keys, Guitar, Vocals
 Dylan Mattheisen - Guitars, Vocals
 Cody Votolato - Guitars, Keys
 Alex Kent - Bass guitar, Vocals
 Garron Dupree - Bass guitar
 Todd Gummerman - Keys, Samples
Additional Vocals:
 Sherri Dupree-Bemis
 Christian Holden
 Zack Shaw
 Michelle Zauner
 Stacy King
 Christie Dupree
 Kayla Dupree
 Joshua Sultan
 Parker Case
Jon Herroon
Production:
 Produced by Darren King and Max Bemis
 Engineered by Darren King
 Additional Pro-Tools engineering by Collin Dupree
 Mixed by Will Yip with Vince Rattiat 4 Recording
 Mastered by Ryan Smith at Sterling Sound

References 

2016 albums
Say Anything (band) albums
Albums produced by Will Yip
Equal Vision Records albums